Gary Nelson Blaylock (born October 11, 1931) is an American former professional baseball player, coach, scout and manager. A right-handed pitcher, he appeared in Major League Baseball for the St. Louis Cardinals and the New York Yankees during the 1959 season.

In 41 career Major League games, 13 as a starting pitcher, Blaylock had a 4–6 record with a 4.80 earned run average. In 125 innings pitched, he gave up 147 hits and 58 bases on balls. Blaylock recorded 81 strikeouts and three complete games. He also spent three seasons in the Venezuelan Professional Baseball League, two with the Industriales de Valencia and one with the Licoreros de Pampero, going 15–13 in 35 career games.

Blaylock was signed by the Cardinals in 1950 and spent nine seasons in the St. Louis farm system, winning 97 games before making the 1959 MLB roster.  After 26 games pitched with the Cardinals, and five appearances as a pinch runner, he was claimed off waivers by the Yankees on July 26, 1959, and worked in 15 more games that season. He then resumed his minor league pitching career in 1960, before becoming a manager and instructor in the Yankee farm system in 1963.

Blaylock moved to the Kansas City Royals' organization in the early 1970s, managed the Billings Mustangs of the Rookie-level Pioneer League from 1971–73 and then was a scout and minor league instructor before serving as the MLB Royals' pitching coach from 1984–87.  He was a member of the Royals' 1985 world championship team. Blaylock was inducted into the Dunklin County Hall of Honor in 2010 at the Dunklin County Library in Kennett, Missouri.

References

External links

Retrosheet

1931 births
Living people
Baseball coaches from Missouri
Baseball players from Missouri
Binghamton Triplets managers
Billings Mustangs managers
Colorado Rockies scouts
Columbus Red Birds players
Detroit Tigers scouts
Fort Lauderdale Yankees players
Greensboro Yankees players
Houston Buffaloes players
Industriales de Valencia players
Johnson City Cardinals players
Kansas City Royals coaches
Kansas City Royals scouts
Licoreros de Pampero players
Major League Baseball pitching coaches
New York Yankees players
Omaha Cardinals players
People from Dunklin County, Missouri
Richmond Virginians (minor league) players
Rochester Red Wings players
St. Louis Cardinals players
Syracuse Chiefs managers